Koumpentoum Department is one of the 45 departments of Senegal, one of the four in the Tambacounda Region of east Senegal. It was created in 2008.

The department has two urban communes; Koumpentoum and Malem Niani.

The rest of the department is divided into two arrondissements, which are in turn divided into rural districts (communautés rurales):

Bamba Thialène Arrondissement: 
 Ndame
 Kahène
 Bamba Thialène
Kouthiaba Wolof Arrondissement:
Kouthia Gaydi
Kouthiaba Wolof
Pass Koto
Payar

References

Departments of Senegal
Tambacounda Region